Veracruz is a state in central eastern Mexico that is divided into 212 municipalities. According to the 2020 Mexican Census, it is the fourth most populated state with  inhabitants and the 11th largest by land area spanning .

Municipalities in Veracruz are administratively autonomous of the state according to the 115th article of the 1917 Constitution of Mexico. Every four years, citizens elect a municipal president (Spanish: presidente municipal) by a plurality voting system who heads a concurrently elected municipal council (ayuntamiento) responsible for providing all the public services for their constituents. The municipal council consists of a variable number of trustees and councillors (regidores y síndicos). Municipalities are responsible for public services (such as water and sewerage), street lighting, public safety, traffic, and the maintenance of public parks, gardens and cemeteries. They may also assist the state and federal governments in education, emergency fire and medical services, environmental protection and maintenance of monuments and historical landmarks. Since 1984, they have had the power to collect property taxes and user fees, although more funds are obtained from the state and federal governments than from their own income.

The largest municipality by population is Veracruz, with 607,209 residents (7.53% of the state's total), while the smallest is Landero y Coss with 1,543 residents. The newest municipalities were created in 2003: San Rafael and Santiago Sochiapan.

Municipalities

Notes

References

External links
Directory of Municipalities (Veracruz State Govt.)
Excel file of all Municipalities & Localidades (SHP available for payment

 
Veracruz